Artur Jorge may refer to:

Artur Jorge (footballer, born 1946), full name Artur Jorge Braga Melo Teixeira, Portuguese football forward and manager
Artur Jorge (footballer, born 1972), full name Artur Jorge Torres Gomes Araújo Amorim, Portuguese football defender and manager
Artur Jorge (footballer, born 1994), full name Artur Jorge Marques Amorim, Portuguese football defender
Tucka (born 1996), full name Artur Jorge dos Santos Soares, Portuguese football forward

See also
Arthur George (1915–2013), Australian lawyer and association football administrator
Arthur Edward George (1875–1951), English soldier, engineer, businessman, and racing driver
Artúr Görgei (1818–1916), Hungarian military leader